Events from the year 1787 in Canada.

Incumbents
Monarch: George III

Governors
Governor of the Canadas: Guy Carleton, 1st Baron Dorchester
Governor of New Brunswick: Thomas Carleton
Governor of Nova Scotia: John Parr
Commodore-Governor of Newfoundland: John Elliot
Governor of St. John's Island: Edmund Fanning

Events
HBC David Thompson wintered with Piegans on Bow River.
Prince William Henry (future William IV) lands at Quebec.
At an investigation into judicial abuses, it is stated that one judge takes wine to excess, before taking his seat on the Bench; and that another habitually disregards the pertinent French law and applies the law of England.
Toronto Purchase

Births
February 10 – John McDonald, businessman and political figure (d.1860)
February 12 – Norbert Provencher, clergyman, missionary and Bishop (d.1853)
November 12 – Pierre-Flavien Turgeon, Archbishop of Quebec (d.1867)
November 9 – William MacBean George Colebrooke, lieutenant governor of New Brunswick (d.1870)

Deaths
 April 14 – Benjamin Frobisher, fur-trader (b. 1742)

References 

 
Canada
87